The Fairmont Railroad Bridge is a truss bridge that carries the Norfolk Southern Railway across the Monongahela River just north of Fairmont, West Virginia. The bridge was built in 1853 as one of the early works of Albert Fink, the engineer who popularized the use of iron structures as opposed to those that are made of stone masonry or wood. It was reconstructed in 1912 and continues to serve as a major industrial route.

See also
List of bridges documented by the Historic American Engineering Record in West Virginia

External links

Bridges over the Monongahela River
Bridges completed in 1912
Norfolk Southern Railway bridges
Fairmont, West Virginia
Historic American Engineering Record in West Virginia
1912 establishments in West Virginia
Railroad bridges in West Virginia